Taunton is a city in Bristol County, Massachusetts, United States. It is the seat of Bristol County. Taunton is situated on the Taunton River which winds its way through the city on its way to Mount Hope Bay,  to the south. At the 2020 census, the city had a population of 59,408. Shaunna O'Connell is the mayor of Taunton.

Founded in 1637 by members of the Plymouth Colony, Taunton is one of the oldest towns in the United States. The Native Americans called the region Cohannet, Tetiquet and Titicut before the arrival of the Europeans. Taunton is also known as the "Silver City", as it was a historic center of the silver industry beginning in the 19th century when companies such as Reed & Barton, F. B. Rogers, Poole Silver, and others produced fine-quality silver goods in the city.

Since December 1914, the city of Taunton has provided a large annual light display each December on Taunton Green, giving it the additional nickname of the Christmas City.

The original boundaries of Taunton included the land now occupied by many surrounding towns, including Norton, Easton, Mansfield, Dighton, Raynham, Berkley, and Lakeville. Possession of the latter is still noted by the naming of Taunton Hill in Assonet.

History

Beginnings 
Taunton was founded by settlers from England and officially incorporated as a town on September 3, 1639. Most of the town's settlers were originally from Taunton in Somerset, England, which led early settlers to name the settlement after that town. At the time of Taunton's incorporation, they explained their choice of name as being "in honor and love to our dear native country." Prior to 1640, the Taunton area was called Cohannet, Tetiquet or Titiquet.

The English founders of Taunton purchased the land from the Nemasket Natives in 1637 as part of the Tetiquet Purchase and the remaining native families were relocated to the praying town of Ponkapoag in present-day Canton, Massachusetts. Elizabeth Poole, contrary to local folklore, did not take part in the town purchase but was among its greatest benefactors and played a significant role in the founding of its church. Described as "the foundress of Taunton" and its matriarch, Poole "was accorded equality of rights, whether in the purchase of lands, [or] in the sharing of iron works holdings," having been a financier of the settlement's first dam and mill built for the manufacture of bar iron.  Plymouth Colony was formally divided into counties on June 2, 1685, with Taunton becoming the shire town of Bristol County. The counties of Plymouth Colony were transferred to the Province of Massachusetts Bay on the arrival of its charter and governor on May 14, 1692. The Taunton area has been the site of skirmishes and battles during various conflicts, including King Philip's War and the American Revolution. Taunton was re-incorporated as a city on May 11, 1864.

Industrial legacy 
In 1656, the first successful iron works in Plymouth Colony was established on the Two Mile River, in what is now part of Raynham. The Taunton Iron Works operated for over 200 years until 1876. It was the first of many iron industries in Taunton.

During the 19th century, Taunton became known as the "Silver City", as it was home to many silversmithing operations, including Reed & Barton, F.B. Rogers, the Poole Silver Company, and the Taunton Silverplate Company.

In the 19th century, Taunton was also the center of an important iron-making industry, utilizing much bog iron from the numerous swamps in the surrounding area. The iron industry in Taunton produced a variety of goods including stoves (Weir Stove Company/Glenwood), tacks (Field Tack Company) and machinery. One of the more successful companies during this period was the Mason Machine Works, founded by William Mason, which produced machinery for the textile industry, as well as steam locomotives. The Taunton Locomotive Works (begun in 1846) also operated in the city during this time.

Taunton was also home to several textile mills (Whittenton Mills) and other industries, such as felt (Bacon Felt) and brick making.

During the 19th century, Taunton was a major shipping point for grain from the inland rural farm areas of Massachusetts to the rest of the nation via Weir Village and the Taunton River. With the advent of the railroad, Taunton would also become an important transportation hub due to its central location.

The city formed the Taunton Municipal Light Plant (TMLP) in 1897, when it decided to purchase the floundering Taunton Electric Lighting Company, making it a publicly owned electric utility. Today, TMLP provides electric service to 34,000 customers in Taunton, Berkley, Raynham, and sections of Dighton, Lakeville and Bridgewater. TMLP is governed by a three-member Board of Commissioners, which is elected by the citizens of Taunton.

In the late 19th century, Taunton was a stop on the national bicycle racing circuit. In 1897, the  open event made news when third-place finisher W. E. Becker brutally attacked second-place winner Major Taylor, knocking him unconscious for fifteen minutes.

Twentieth century 
Built in 1942, U.S. Army Camp Myles Standish was a departure point for over a million U.S. and allied military personnel bound for Europe during World War II. It also functioned as a prisoner of war camp housing German and Italian soldiers. While Camp Myles Standish was later closed in 1946, it was re-purposed as the Paul A Dever School which was a facility that housed mentally disabled persons. It services manufacturing, offices, high tech, and distribution centers.

The National Weather Service operates a regional weather forecast office that serves much of Massachusetts, all of Rhode Island, and most of northern Connecticut there.  The National Weather Service also operates the Northeast River Forecast Center on the site, serving New England and most of New York state.  Several major companies operate within the industrial park and in other parts of the city.

Twenty-first century 
In October 2005, the Whittenton Pond Dam north of the downtown area threatened to fail following a week that brought  of rain to the city. Over 2,000 city residents were evacuated, all downtown businesses were ordered closed and Mayor Robert Nunes issued a state of emergency. In response, Massachusetts Governor Mitt Romney ordered an immediate inspection of high-risk dams throughout the Commonwealth.

In 2010, the historic Taunton City Hall was severely damaged in an arson fire. City government operated out of the former Lowell M. Maxham School on Oak Street for ten years, until the building was renovated and re-opened in September 2020.

In 2012 Taunton became the target location for a Wampanoag casino complex which was embroiled in conflict by competing regional bands of the Wampanoag over territory claims. The proposed casino resort complex location is adjacent to a local elementary school and the regional technical high school, generating protests by parent and teacher groups.

On June 10, 2012, the City of Taunton dedicated the Taunton Global War on Terrorism War Memorial on Church Green.

Taunton is home to a General Dynamics Mission Systems facility, which develops military communications equipment.

Geography 

It is the third-largest city by area in Massachusetts, after Boston and Barnstable.

Taunton has one major river, the Taunton River, along with its tributaries, including the Mill River and the Three Mile River.

Climate
According to the Köppen climate classification, Taunton has either a hot-summer humid continental climate (abbreviated Dfa), or a hot-summer humid sub-tropical climate (abbreviated Cfa), depending on the isotherm used.

Historic districts

There are nine designated historic districts within the city:

 Bay Road Historic District, also known as Post Road. The road runs from Taunton to Boston., 1 structure, 2 objects)
 Bristol County Courthouse Complex (13 acres, three buildings)
 Church Green Historic District, also known as Meetinghouse Common (160 acres, 18 buildings, one object)
 Hopewell Mills District (120 acres, 13 buildings)
 Old Bay Road Historic District, also known as The Post Road; The King's Highway (150 acres, 1 structure, three objects)
 Reed and Barton Complex
 Taunton Green Historic District (50 acres, 22 buildings, three objects)
 Taunton State Hospital Historic District, also known as the Taunton Lunatic Asylum, 38 buildings, eight structures)

Due to the annexation of towns from the original town of Taunton, the city now is irregularly shaped, with it (along with neighboring Raynham) roughly making a triangle. The city is bordered by Norton to the northwest, Easton to the north, Raynham to the northeast, Middleborough to the east, Lakeville to the southeast, Berkley and Dighton to the south, and Rehoboth to the west.

City neighborhoods include the Bird Lanes, Clearview Estates, East Taunton, Elliot's Corner, Herring Run Estates, Linden Estates, Matthews Landing, North Taunton, Oakland, Pine Crest Estates, Pine Hill Estates, Wades Corner, Weir Village, Westville, Whittenton, Whittenton Junction, Britannia Village or Britanniaville, Willis Lake Village and Woodward Estates. Taunton is also home to almost the entirety of Massasoit State Park in East Taunton, and a large portion of the Hockomock Swamp Wildlife Management Area in North Taunton.

Demographics 

As of the census of 2000, there were 55,874 people, 22,045 households, and 14,473 families residing in the city. The racial makeup of the city was 83.67% (79.7% Non-Hispanic) White, 4.84% African American, 0.26% Native American, 1.0% Asian, 0.03% Pacific Islander, 5.59% from other races, and 2.21% from two or more races. Persons of Hispanic or Latino ethnicity constituted 6.73% of the population.

The city of Taunton was very multi-cultural with peoples of different origins living within the city. 34% of the city was Luso-American. The biggest ethnic backgrounds people claimed were 23% Portuguese, 17% Irish, 9% English, 9% French, 8% Cape Verdean and 4% Puerto Rican. Most of Taunton's immigration occurred near the turn of the 1900s when immigrants came to work in the city's mills.

There were 22,045 households, out of which 32.3% had children under the age of 18 living with them, 45.0% were married couples living together, 15.4% had a female householder with no husband present, and 35.3% were non-families. Of all households 28.2% were made up of individuals, and 9.9% had someone living alone who was 65 years of age or older. The average household size was 2.60 and the average family size was 3.09.

In the city, the population was spread out, with 24.9% under the age of 18, 8.0% from 18 to 24, 33.2% from 25 to 44, 21.0% from 45 to 64, and 12.9% who were 65 years of age or older. The median age was 36 years. For every 100 females, there were 92.5 males. For every 100 females age 18 and over, there were 89.2 males.

Males had a median income of $36,895 versus $27,686 for females. The per capita income for the city was $19,899. About 10.0% of families and 12.0% of the population were below the poverty line, including 13.9% of those under age 18 and 11.3% of those age 65 or over.

Religion 
Numerous religious groups exist within the city, including Roman Catholic, Protestant, and Jewish congregations. The First Parish Church, now a Unitarian Universalist church, located at Church Green at the east end of downtown, was founded in 1637, before the Town of Taunton was even established. The current church dates from 1830. The Pilgrim Congregational Church on Broadway was formed in 1821, its current church built in 1851. The city's oldest Roman Catholic parish, St. Mary's Church, is located further north at the intersection of Broadway and Washington Street, known as Saint Mary's Square. In the 1880s Jewish immigrants from Russia began to move to the town, and Congregation Agudath Achim was founded in 1911. The congregation is now an independent progressive synagogue.

Economy 
Taunton's economy has historically been based on silversmithing and shipbuilding. Reed & Barton produced the 1996 Summer Olympics medals and silverware used exclusively for the White House. Also, the city produced the anchor for the USS Constitution. The nearby town of Raynham produced the anchor for the Civil War-era ironclad USS Monitor.

Today, the city's economy has many emphases on semiconductor, silicon, and electronics manufacturing. It is home to the corporate headquarters of many leading corporations in various industries. Currently, the city is trying to attract biotechnology research companies to its industrial parks.

Silver City Galleria was a large shopping mall in Taunton catering to the local city and to the neighboring towns and cities of Raynham, Berkley, Rehoboth, Dighton, New Bedford and Norton. It was open for 28 years closing on February 29, 2020.

Arts and culture

Public spaces 

The Taunton Green is the city's central square. Early in its history, "The Green" was used as a training ground for militias in the American Revolution. Some say it was also the site of the historic "Liberty & Union"/"Taunton" flag raising in 1774 by the Sons of Liberty, prior to the American Revolution. Since the early 20th century, Taunton Green has temporarily been transformed during the winter holiday season into a grand display of holiday lights, scenes, and extravagant events. This is where and how the city earned its unofficial nickname in the surrounding areas as the "Christmas City."

"The Green" continues to provide a centralized location for citywide Christmas activities, other holidays, events, and parades for the citizens of Taunton. A fountain is located at the center of the Taunton Green. Always to be seen flapping together in emblematic unison, the "Liberty & Union" flag and the U.S. flag fly side by side on the flagpole at the city's center.

The city is served by a central public library, the Taunton Public Library, which opened in 1903 and has undergone several expansions and renovations since that time. Also of note is the Old Colony Historical Society, which archives the city and region's past.

The city is home to two state parks operated by the Massachusetts Department of Conservation and Recreation: Massasoit State Park in East Taunton and Watson Pond State Park in the north part of the city.

Architecture 
The city of Taunton has a wide array of architecture ranging from the colonial period to modern times. There are numerous pre-Revolutionary War private homes within the city, the oldest of which is the Joseph Willis House on Worcester Street, dating to about 1688. The city has over one hundred buildings listed on the National Register of Historic Places.

Perhaps the most impressive structure in the city is the towering Bristol County Superior Courthouse, built in 1894 and designed by Frank Irving Cooper. With its tall copper dome, the Superior Courthouse is visible from many surrounding areas. It was added to the National Register of Historic Places in 1978. Currently, the Courthouse Complex is undergoing a major expansion and renovation program.

Other significant buildings in the city include some fine stone churches, including the First Parish Church (1830), the Pilgrim Congregational Church (1851) and St. Mary's Church (1868) on Broadway.

Downtown Taunton has a number of historic commercial blocks along Main Street, Taunton Green and Broadway, built during the period from about 1840 to 1920.

Many large homes built by the wealthy industrialists and merchants of the late 19th and early 20th century line Route 44, both east (Dean Street) and west (Winthrop Street) of the city center, while a majority of the city is occupied by more modest wood-framed single and multi-family homes, many over 100 years old. Modern single-family subdivisions, built mostly since the 1950s, exist on the outskirts of the sprawling city.

The Central Fire Station at 50 School Street is recognized as the oldest functioning station house in the United States. The historic Taunton City Hall is located adjacent to Church Green.

Museums and galleries 
One of New England's oldest historical societies, the Old Colony Historical Society is located on picturesque Church Green. Founded in 1853, the Society maintains a museum of regional objects, houses a research library specializing in local history and genealogy, and hosts arts and cultural events throughout the year.

Taunton has four art galleries: Taunton Art Association (John Baradas Gallery), Hughes/Donahue Gallery, Art Euphoric, and the Trescott Street Gallery. The Taunton Art Association was founded in 1973 but had it roots in the Girl's Club in the early 1960s. Hughes/Donahue Gallery, founded in 2007, is a local community gallery serving local Taunton artists, as well as the surrounding areas of Southeastern Massachusetts and the cities of Providence, Rhode Island, and Washington, DC. Art Euphoric, founded in 2008, has both visual and craft exhibits and sales. The Trescott Street Gallery, founded in 2012, is primarily a visual-arts gallery but also exhibits crafts.

Film
In March 2008, Hollywood director Martin Scorsese filmed a portion of the film Shutter Island starring Leonardo DiCaprio in Taunton on location at the Whittenton Mills Complex. Surrogates, starring Bruce Willis, was partly filmed in the city, at the old Paul Dever school.

Government 
As the seat of Bristol County, Taunton is home to many of the county's courthouses and administrative offices. These include the Taunton District Court, Bristol County Register of Deeds, and historic Bristol County Superior Courthouse.

Taunton has a mayor–council government system in which the mayor, who is elected every two years, has executive power. The incumbent mayor, Shaunna O'Connell, became mayor of Taunton in January 2020. She is the first female mayor elected in Taunton's history. O'Connell's predecessor, Thomas Hoye Jr., resigned after being appointed Bristol County Register of Probate by Governor Charlie Baker.

There has been some controversy regarding Hoye's appointment. The announcements of Hoye's appointment and O'Connell's mayoral campaign occurred simultaneously, just one day before nomination papers for public office were due. Various journalists and elected officials regarded Hoye's appointment as a "backroom deal" devised by Lieutenant Governor Karyn Polito to give O'Connell better chances of being elected mayor.

The Taunton City Council is the legislative branch of government in Taunton. It is made up of nine members who represent the city at-large. Taunton residents may vote for a maximum of nine City Council candidates during municipal elections; the nine candidates with the most votes become councilors. Councilors are elected to two-year terms, and there is no limit on the number of terms an individual councilor may serve. Despite officially being nonpartisan, the de facto composition of the City Council consists of six Republicans and three Democrats as of 2022. The leader of the City Council is the president, with the position rotating annually. Rather than being elected by the City Council, the most senior member of the City Council who has not yet served as president is given the title.

In addition to the City Council, there are four committees whose members are elected by voters to two-year terms: The School Committee, Zoning Board of Appeals, Planning Board, and TMLP Commission. Taunton has numerous other commissions and departments whose members are appointed by the mayor and subsequently confirmed or rejected by the City Council, e.g. the Airport Commission and Historic District Commission.

Taunton is represented in the Massachusetts House of Representatives by three representatives: Carol Doherty (D-Third Bristol), Pat Haddad (D-Fifth Bristol), and Norm Orrall (R-Twelfth Bristol). Taunton is represented in the Massachusetts Senate by Marc Pacheco (D-First Plymouth and Bristol). Federally, Taunton is a part of Massachusetts' 4th congressional district, which is represented by Jake Auchincloss. Taunton, like the rest of Massachusetts, is represented in the U.S. Senate by Elizabeth Warren and Ed Markey.

Taunton is the hometown of many prominent political figures. Robert Treat Paine, a long-time Taunton resident, was a signer of the Declaration of Independence and the first Attorney General of the Commonwealth of Massachusetts. Democratic political consultant Stephanie Cutter and former governor Marcus Morton also hail from Taunton.

Taunton has been visited by twelve former U.S. presidents. Notably, Abraham Lincoln campaigned for Zachary Taylor in Taunton before the 1848 presidential election, twelve years before Lincoln was elected president himself. Most recently, Bill Clinton campaigned at Friedman Middle School ahead of Super Tuesday for Hillary Clinton's 2016 presidential campaign.

Camp Myles Standish, a former prisoner of war camp and welcoming area for a million Allied soldiers during World War II, was once a candidate site for the United Nations' headquarters.

Education 
Education in Taunton ranges from preschool through post-secondary education.

Public primary and secondary 
Taunton has nine public elementary schools and three public middle schools.

Elementary schools
 Edmund Hatch Bennett Elementary School
 East Taunton Elementary School
 Harold H. Galligan Elementary School
 Hopewell Elementary School
 Edward F. Leddy Elementary School
 Joseph C. Chamberlain Elementary School
 Elizabeth Pole Elementary School
 Mulcahey Elementary School (formerly Mulcahey Middle School)

Middle schools
 Benjamin A. Friedman Middle School
 Joseph H. Martin Middle School
 John F. Parker Middle School

High schools
Taunton has three public high schools: Taunton High School, Taunton Alternative High School, and Bristol-Plymouth Regional Technical School.

Closed former schools in Taunton include:

 Lowell M. Maxham Elementary School (closed in June 2010)
 Walker Elementary School (closed in June 2010)
 Pole Elementary School (closed 2007)
 Leonard Elementary School (closed 2009)
 Barnum School (closed 2013)
 Cohannet Middle School (closed in June 2000)
 Summer Street School

Private schools 
The city has one Catholic school of the Roman Catholic Diocese of Fall River, Our Lady of Lourdes School, in Weir Village, serving grades Pre-K–8. Bishop Connolly High School in Fall River serves as the local Catholic high school.

Taunton formerly had one Catholic middle-high school, Coyle and Cassidy School. Prior to 2014 it had only high school and a separate Taunton Catholic Middle School provided middle school, but that year the two merged into the Coyle and Cassidy building. Coyle and Cassidy closed in the wake of the COVID-19 pandemic and merged into Connolly, but Connolly did not take Coyle and Cassidy's middle school students, who were instead directed to Our Lady of Lourdes School.

It also formerly housed St. Mary's Primary School, a Catholic elementary which opened in 1908. It was previously known as St. Mary's School and St. Mary's Elementary School.  its enrollment was about 266; this fell to 133 in 2018. The school closed that year. Principal Michael O'Brien stated that the state of the physical plant was one factor in the school's closure.  The school did not have an elevator. In addition to the physical plant factor, the diocese also no longer wished to cover the school's expenses. In 2018 it was $500,000 in debt for salaries and other items, and it also had a $1.5 million debt for 2006–2014 medical/dental insurance costs.

Higher education 
Taunton is home to a satellite campus of Bay State College at 101 Industrial Park Road serving Associate and bachelor's degrees to working professionals and career changers in the fields of business and management, criminal justice and medical assisting.  It had formerly been home to a satellite campus of Bristol Community College, which met at the (former) Taunton Catholic Middle School. In addition, the city houses career schools such as the RobRoy Academy beauty school.

Media

Television and radio
Taunton has local Public, educational, and government access (PEG) cable TV channels which include the Public-access television Taunton Community Access and Media, Inc. (Comcast Channel 15; Verizon 22), Educational television Taunton Educational Network (Comcast Channel 9; Verizon 23) which is run by the Taunton High School TV Studio and Government-access television Taunton Municipal Network (Comcast Channel 17; Verizon 24). Comcast's Taunton system carries all Providence and Boston stations as well and both markets are available over-the-air. The two radio stations based in Taunton are AM 1530/ 99.7 FM WVBF (licensed to nearby Middleborough Center), which features local programming and the Talking Information Center out of Marshfield, a non-profit radio station serving the blind and print impaired population of Massachusetts; and WSNE-FM 93.3, which primarily serves the Providence radio market and has its studios in the city of Providence.

From 1949 until 2007, Taunton was also served by local radio station WPEP-AM 1570. However the station was silenced with the upgrade of Keating Wilcox's station also on 1570, in Beverly, Massachusetts.  The city is now served by AM 1530/99.7 FM WVBF. Since August 2019, the station has been owned by Dean of the State Senate Marc R. Pacheco of Taunton, and programmed by longtime New England radio veteran Chris Keach, who started work at the station in 2010 when it was owned by Steven Callahan and managed by Tony Lopes. The AM signal now broadcasts with 5000 watts of power, and covers a large portion of Eastern Massachusetts and Rhode Island.

Newspapers
Taunton is served by several publications including the Silver City Bulletin, Brockton Enterprise, and the Taunton Daily Gazette. Regional papers of importance such as the Boston Globe, Boston Herald, and Providence Journal, are also widely available.

Internet
Some of the major Internet providers in Taunton are Comcast, EarthLink, SBC Yahoo! Dial, and Verizon. The Taunton Municipal Lighting Plant (TMLP), Taunton's electric company, is also an Internet service provider for the city and its surrounding towns.

Infrastructure

Fire department 
Taunton has 127 firefighters on the Taunton Fire Department (TFD). The TFD currently operates out of five fire stations, located throughout the city, and operates a fire apparatus fleet of five engines, three ladders, one brush unit, one dive rescue unit, two fireboats, and several other special, support, and reserve units. The current Chief of Department is Timothy J. Bradshaw.

Healthcare and utilities 

Taunton is home to the Morton Hospital and Medical Center, located on Washington Street, just north of the city center.

Taunton State Hospital is a psychiatric hospital located on Hodges Avenue. One of its historic old buildings had to be brought down after it was severely damaged by fire in 2006. This hospital is now one of the very few mental health hospitals in Massachusetts for longer-term in-patient care of psychiatric patients.

Electricity is provided to residents by the Taunton Municipal Lighting Plant (TMLP), located in the south end. The city has a municipal water system, with a treatment plant and water supply in nearby Lakeville, as well as a public sewer system with a treatment plant on West Water Street in the south end of the city, discharging into the Taunton River.

Transportation 

The Taunton Railway began in 1838 as the main rail transportation system, both industrial and passenger, connecting Taunton with points south, east, north, and west, including New Bedford and Cape Cod, Fall River and Newport, Somerset and Providence, Attleboro and Providence, Mansfield and Boston, Stoughton and Boston, Raynham, Middleborough and Wareham as time went on.

Taunton is the central highway hub of southeastern Massachusetts. Much of the eastern parts of the state's major highways intersect and/or run through the city, especially at its center. US 44, MA 138, and MA 140 intersect at Taunton Green, the square at Taunton's center. MA 140 is also accessible from the eastern neighborhood of the city, popularly referred to as "East Taunton." Additionally, MA 24 and MA 140 intersect near East Taunton, and it is at that junction that Route 140 ceases to be a 2-lane divided freeway from the south and becomes a smaller state highway to the north. Interstate 495 runs through the northern portion of Taunton, unofficially referred to as "North Taunton", and parallel to Myles Standish Industrial Park, Taunton's main industrial park.

Various smaller routes run through other parts of the city. These include a small portion of MA 104, close to the Taunton-Raynham city limits, and MA 79, close to the Taunton-Berkley-Lakeville (Plymouth County) city-town-county limits. Taunton is the western terminus of MA 104. It merges into US 44 after entering the city.

Several CSX freight rails pass through the city on their way towards Fall River, New Bedford and a link-up with the line in Middleborough. The phased South Coast Rail project is planned to extend MBTA Commuter Rail service through Taunton and to the cities of Fall River and New Bedford. Phase I of the project is currently under construction and is due to be completed by late 2023, it will extend the current Middleborough/Lakeville Line to Fall River and New Bedford via a station stop in East Taunton, but no stop in Downtown Taunton. Phase II of the project is proposed to be built by 2030, and would extend the current Stoughton Line south through Easton, Raynham, and a stop near Downtown Taunton on Dean Street, before joining the route of Phase I. The Greater Attleboro Taunton Regional Transit Authority, or GATRA, provides bus mass transit.

Taunton has its own municipal airport, serving mostly smaller craft and occasional commuter jets. The nearest airport with national airline service is T.F. Green Airport in Rhode Island, and the nearest international service is at Logan International Airport in Boston.

Notable people

Sister cities 
Taunton is a sister city of:

  Taunton, Somerset, England, United Kingdom
  Angra do Heroismo, Terceira, Azores, Portugal
  Lagoa (Azores), Sao Miguel, Azores, Portugal

See also 
 List of mill towns in Massachusetts

Explanatory notes

References 

 History of Taunton, Massachusetts from Its Settlement to the Present Time by Samuel Hopkins Emery, published 1893.

External links 

 City of Taunton official website
 Taunton Area Chamber of Commerce
 Vital Records of Taunton Mass. to 1850
 Massachusetts Historical Commission Reconnaissance Survey Report on Taunton. Good Federally funded review of Taunton's history, especially its industrial history. Published 1981.
 History of Taunton, Massachusetts, from its settlement to the present time, by Samuel Hopkins Emery 1893. 
 Duane Hamilton Hurd, History of Bristol County, Massachusetts: With Biographical Sketches of Many Pioneers and Prominent Men. Part 1. Part 2. Taunton Chapter 58 page 728. Published 1883.
 Wall & Gray. 1871 Taunton.
 City of Taunton, Mass. 1875. Panoramic Map by O.H. Bailey at Library of Congress. 

 
1637 establishments in Massachusetts
Cities in Bristol County, Massachusetts
Cities in Massachusetts
County seats in Massachusetts
Populated places established in 1637
Providence metropolitan area